NRHS may refer to:

Educational institutions

Canada
Northumberland Regional High School, Westville, Nova Scotia

United States

Narragansett Regional High School, Templeton, Massachusetts
Nashoba Regional High School, Bolton, Massachusetts
Nauset Regional High School, Eastham, Massachusetts
North Reading High School, North Reading, Massachusetts
Newfound Regional High School, Bristol, New Hampshire
Nazareth Regional High School (Brooklyn), New York City, New York
New Rochelle High School, New Rochelle, New York
North Rockland High School, Thiells, New York
North Rowan High School, Spencer, North Carolina
North Ridgeville High School, North Ridgeville, Ohio
North Royalton High School, North Royalton, Ohio
Nansemond River High School, Suffolk, Virginia

Other uses
National Railway Historical Society, United States

See also
 NRH (disambiguation)